Mended is the sixth overall solo studio album and second English studio album by American Latin pop singer-songwriter Marc Anthony, released on May 21, 2002 by Columbia Records and Sony Discos. It was re-released with two bonus tracks in 2003 as Mended: Bonus Tracks.

After going through several release date changes, Marc Anthony released his second English studio album, Mended in mid-2002, shortly after issuing Libre. Mended delivers more of Anthony's passionate, urgent songs of love and betrayal, destined for mass consumption. The album features the hit singles "I've Got You", the Spanish version "Te Tengo Aqui", "Love Won't Get Any Better," as well as the well-known single "Tragedy." Bruce Springsteen composed a song, "I'll Stand By You Always", for Marc Anthony but the song was omitted from the album for unknown reasons.

The album was certified Platinum by the CRIA in October 2002 for sales of 100,000 units. The album debut at number 3 on Billboard 200 and sold over 111,000 copies in the first week in the United States. It sold over 1.3 millions of copies worldwide.

Track listing 
 "Love Won't Get Any Better" (Marc Anthony, Dan Shea, Kara DioGuardi, Cory Rooney) – 3:38
 "She Mends Me" (Marc Anthony, Dan Shea, Kara DioGuardi, Cory Rooney) – 3:15
 "I've Got You" (Kara DioGuardi, Cory Rooney) – 3:56
 "I Need You" (Cory Rooney) – 4:11
 "Tragedy" (Rob Thomas, Cory Rooney) – 4:04
 "I Reach for You" (Marc Anthony, Dan Shea, Kara DioGuardi, Cory Rooney) – 3:28
 "I Swear" (Marc Anthony, Kara DioGuardi, Cory Rooney, Steve Morales, David Siegel) – 3:46
 "Don't Tell Me It's Love" (Marc Anthony, Dan Shea, Kara DioGuardi) – 3:34
 "Do You Believe in Loneliness" (Marc Anthony, Dan Shea, Kara DioGuardi, Cory Rooney) – 4:04
 "Give Me a Reason" (Dan Shea, Kara DioGuardi, Cory Rooney) – 3:15
 "I Wanna Be Free" (Marc Anthony, Dan Shea, Kara DioGuardi) – 3:58
 "Everything You Do" (Marc Anthony, Andrew Fromm, Keith Follese) – 3:23
 "Te Tengo Aquí" ("I've Got You") (Alejandro Lerner, Kara DioGuardi, Cory Rooney, Gizelle D'Cole) – 3:59

Bonus tracks 
  "Me Haces Falta" ("I  Need You") – 3:52
 "Tragedia" ("Tragedy") – 3:45

Personnel 

 Marc Anthony – vocals
 Michael Thompson – acoustic & electric guitars
 Renne Toledo – acoustic & nylon string guitars
 Eric Kupper – guitar, keyboards, programming
 Chieli Minucci – guitar
 Andy Abad – guitar
 David Dominguez – guitar
 Juan A Gonzalez – piano, keyboards
 Cory Rooney – keyboards, programming, background vocals
 Dan Shea – keyboards, programming
 Marc Russell – bass
 Erben Perez – bass
 Bobby Allende – percussion
 Richie Jones – programming
 Wendy Pederson – background vocals
 Raul Midon – background vocals
 Shelen Thomas – background vocals

Charts

Weekly charts

Year-end charts

Certifications

References 

2002 albums
Marc Anthony albums
Columbia Records albums
Sony Discos albums
Albums produced by Cory Rooney